Beach Girls was a six-part 2005 American limited series produced by Fox Television Studios and Robert Greenwald Productions and broadcast by Lifetime. The teleplay by Edithe Swensen, Elle Triedman, and Eric Tuchman was based on the 2004 bestselling novel by Luanne Rice.

The Beach Girls were three teenagers who spent their summers in the small, quiet beach town of Hubbard's Point. The trio grew apart and eventually went their separate ways, but the death of one of them reunites the surviving two, Stevie and Maddie, when her widower Jack and daughter Nell arrive in town.

Paul Shapiro, Sandy Smolan, and Jeff Woolnough shared directing credits. The cast included Rob Lowe as Jack, Chelsea Hobbs as Nell, Julia Ormond as Stevie, and Katherine Ashby as Maddie, with Chris Carmack and Cloris Leachman in featured roles.

The opening credits theme song was "Dreams," written by Dolores O'Riordan and Noel Hogan and performed by The Cranberries.

The series was filmed in Chester, Crystal Crescent Beach, and Halifax, all located in Nova Scotia, Canada. It aired in France and Sweden in 2006, Australia in 2007 and New Zealand in 2010. It has been released on DVD by Warner Home Video.

Cast
Rob Lowe as Jack 
Chelsea Hobbs as Nell
Chris Carmack as Cooper 
Katherine Ashby as Maddie 
Julia Ormond as Stevie
Cloris Leachman as Aunt Aida

External links

Lifetime (TV network) original programming
2000s American drama television series
Television series set in 1985
2005 American television series debuts
2005 American television series endings
Television shows based on American novels